Fredrick Muyia Nafukho is a Kenyan-American academic who is Professor of Educational Administration and Human Resource Development. and Associate Dean for Faculty Affairs, College of Education and Human Development at Texas A&M University.

Early life and education 
Fredrick Muyia Nafukho was born on October 9, 1962. He earned a B. Ed in Business Studies and Economics and an M.Ed. in Economics of Education from Kenyatta University, Kenya. He earned his Ph.D. in Leadership and Human Resource Development from Louisiana State University and attended Harvard's Management Development Program (MDP) offered by Harvard Institutes for Higher Education and was certified in 2013.

Career 
Nafukho has served on the faculty of three institutions of higher education including Texas A&M University, University of Arkansas and Moi University. While at these, he has been an Associate Dean for Faculty Affairs (Texas A&M University), a Department Head (Texas A&M University), a Program Chair (Texas A&M University), Professor (Texas A&M University), Associate Professor (University of Arkansas), Graduate Program Director and Assistant Department Head (University of Arkansas), Department Head (Moi University), Senior Lecturer (Moi University), Lecturer (Moi University), and Assistant Lecturer (Moi University).

Research 
Nafukho's research focuses on educational policy analysis within international and comparative education, investment in human capital development, emotional intelligence and leadership development, organisational development, human and organisational learning including the transfer of learning, e-learning  and lifelong learning.

The African Ubuntu worldview of “I am because we are” is articulated in his two books published by Pearson Education and UNESCO, Foundations of Adult Education in Africa, and Management of Adult Education Organisations on Africa

Awards and honors 
Fulbright Fellowship, 1996
Distinguished International Scholar Award, Louisiana State University, 1997
Outstanding New Faculty Award, Dean's Development Council, College of Education and Human Development at Texas A&M University, 2008
Carnegie African Diaspora Fellowship, 2016, International Institute of Education
 Outstanding HRD Scholar Award 2019, Academy of Human Resource Development (AHRD)

Bibliography

Publications

References 

1962 births
Living people
Louisiana State University alumni
Kenyatta University alumni
Texas A&M University faculty
Academic staff of Moi University